Antun Vrančić or Antonio Veranzio (29 May 1504 – 15 June 1573) was a Croatian prelate, writer, diplomat and Archbishop of Esztergom in the 16th century. Antun Vrančić was from Dalmatian town of Šibenik (modern Croatia), then part of the Republic of Venice. Vrančić is also known under his Latinized name Antonius Verantius, while Hungarian documents since the 19th century refer to him as Verancsics Antal.

Biography

Early years
Vrančić was born and raised in Šibenik, city in Dalmatia in the former Republic of Venice. Most historians accept a hypothesis that the Vrančić family was one of the Bosnian noble families that had moved to Šibenik in the era of Ottoman military incursions. Vrančić's uncle Ivan Statilić and his other relative, Croatian viceroy Petar Berislavić, took care of his education. His maternal uncle, János Statileo, Bishop of Transylvania also supported him in Trogir, Šibenik, from 1514 in Hungary and in Padua, where he earned the degree of magister in 1526. After later studies at Vienna and Kraków, Vrančić entered diplomatic service, aged only 26.

Diplomat and prelate

Zápolya's service
In 1530 John Zápolya appointed him as the provost of the Buda cathedral and as a royal secretary. Between 1530-1539 he was also the deputy of the King and after his death he remained with his widow, Isabella Jagiellon. In 1541 he moved with her to Transylvania, but he mostly traveled fulfilling diplomatic services because of his disagreement with cardinal Juraj Utješinović's policy of claiming the Hungarian throne for Isabella's and Zápolya's infant son (instead of conceding it to Ferdinand I as per Treaty of Nagyvárad). Utješinović, appointed by Zápolya as a guardian of his son, John Sigismund Zápolya, fought against Ferdinand and allied himself with the Ottoman Empire.

Habsburg service
In 1549 Vrančić entered Ferdinand's service. In parallel to his diplomatic duties, he held important positions in Catholic Church (the chief dean of Szabolcs County, abbot of Pornó Abbey). In 1553 he was appointed as a bishop of Pécs and sent to Constantinople to conduct negotiations with sultan Suleyman I on Ferdinand's behalf. That mission was previously declined by many other diplomats as an earlier negotiator was imprisoned by the Ottomans. Vrančić spent four years in Asia minor and finally concluded a peace treaty. After his return he was appointed bishop of Eger (17 July 1560 – 25 September 1570). After the Battle of Szigetvár in 1566, as one of Maximilian's ambassadors, Antun was sent to Turkey to negotiate peace again; he arrived in Constantinople on 26 August 1567. After five months of negotiations with Sokollu Mehmed Pasha and Selim II, agreement was reached by 17 February, and the Treaty of Adrianople was signed on 21 February 1568, ending the war between the Holy Roman Empire and Ottoman Empire.  In appreciation of his diplomatic work, the king named him archbishop of Esztergom (17 October 1569 – 15 June 1573).

During his stay in Istanbul, together with Ogier Ghislain de Busbecq, Vrančić discovered Res Gestae Divi Augusti (Eng. The Deeds of the Divine Augustus), a Roman monument in Ankara. His travels throughout the Transylvania, Balkan and Asia minor resulted in his writing extensive travel accounts.

In 1573 he urged Maximilian II to be conciliatory toward rebellious serfs during Croatian–Slovene Peasant Revolt. He remained very critical towards the Croatian magnates, stressing their responsibility in the revolt and claiming that the Croatian nobles oppress their serfs in ways equal to the Turkish yoke. This attitude was in stark contrast with the cardinal Juraj Drašković ban of Croatia.

On 25 September 1573, he crowned Rudolf II as a king of Hungary and Croatia in Pressburg.

Death 
He died in Eperjes, Kingdom of Hungary (present-day Prešov, Slovakia), just days after having learned that the Pope appointed him cardinal. Following his own wish, Vrančić was buried in Saint Nicholas church in Nagyszombat, Kingdom of Hungary (present-day Trnava, Slovakia).

Influences
Antun Vrančić was in touch with German philosopher, theologian and reformer Philipp Melanchthon (1497–1560); and with Nikola Šubić Zrinski (1508–1566), Croatian ban, poet, statesman and soldier. In Viaggio in Dalmazia ("Journey to Dalmatia", 1774), Alberto Fortis noted that Vrančić's descendants still kept a letter to Vrančić from Dutch philosopher, humanist and writer Erasmus (1465–1536), but no other evidence of correspondence between the two exists today, and modern scholars find it unlikely.

Legacy

After Antun's death, his nephew Faust, who was a well known humanist, linguist and lexicographer of the Renaissance, took over writings from his estate. Two years later, in 1575, he wrote Life of Antun Vrančić, a biography of his uncle, but did not manage to have it published.

Croatian poet Brne Karnarutić dedicated his version of Pyramus and Thisbe to Antun Vrančić in 1586. Antun Vrančić High School in Vrančić's native Šibenik has been named after him since 1991, while a street in the old town centre also bears his name. Many other towns in Croatia have a street named after Vrančić. Croatian Post issued a stamp depicting Vrančić in 2004 honoring the 500th anniversary of his birth.

Bibliography
 De situ Transylvaniae, Moldaviae et Transalpinae 
 Vita Petri Berislavi 
 De rebus gestis Ioannis, regis Hungariae 
 De itinere et legatione sua Constantinopolitana cum fratre Michaele dialogus 
 Iter Buda Hadrianopolium

Sources 
 Manfred Stoy: Vrančić, Antun. In: Biographisches Lexikon zur Geschichte Südosteuropas. Band 4. München 1981, S. 442–444
 
 The Classification of the Letters of Antun Vrančić (abstract)
 Klasifikacija pisama Antuna Vrančića

References

16th-century Croatian people
16th-century Hungarian people
Croatian cardinals
Croatian writers
Archbishops of Esztergom
Bishops of Pécs
Croatian expatriates in Hungary
People from Šibenik
1504 births
1573 deaths
Bishops of Eger
University of Padua alumni